The 2013–14 season was Chelsea Football Club's 100th competitive season, 25th consecutive season in the top flight of English football, 22nd consecutive season in the Premier League and 108th year in existence as a football club. In addition to the domestic league, Chelsea participated in the UEFA Champions League this season, having qualified directly for the group stage by virtue of finishing third in the 2012–13 Premier League. It ultimately reached the semi-finals, losing there to Atlético Madrid. Chelsea came third in the Premier League for a second successive season, thus again qualifying for the Champions League group stage. Chelsea ended their 2013–14 campaign without a trophy, a first since the 2010–11 season. Their league performance, however, was the best since the 2009–10 season, with the team amassing 82 points.

Kits
Supplier: adidas / Sponsor: Samsung

Month-by-month review

June

On 3 June, Chelsea announced that former manager José Mourinho had been appointed as the new manager for the 2013–14 season. He signed a four-year contract with the Blues, up to the end of the 2016–17 season. He was re-united with former squad members John Terry, Frank Lampard, Ashley Cole, John Obi Mikel, Petr Čech, Henrique Hilário and Michael Essien whom he brought back from his loan spell at Real Madrid. Mourinho also brought three coaching staff members with him to Stamford Bridge in Rui Faria, Silvino Louro—both of whom had worked at Chelsea under Mourinho's previous tenure—and José Morais. Mourinho was officially announced to the media on 10 June and took charge of the team on 1 July for the pre-season. One of Mourinho's first games was against Barcelona rival Pep Guardiola, as he managed 2012–13 UEFA Champions League winners Bayern Munich in the 2013 UEFA Super Cup at the Eden Arena in Prague.
In Mourinho's first official interview back, he referred to himself as "The Happy One" in regards to his appointment as the new Chelsea manager, having called himself "The Special One" during his first tenure.

On 13 June, Chelsea and Bayer Leverkusen reached an agreement for the transfer of André Schürrle, subject to the completion of legal documentation and related matters, including personal terms and passing a medical.

Following the release of the 2013–14 Premier League fixtures, Mourinho's first match in charge since his return was at home against Hull City. Chelsea then faced a trip to Old Trafford for David Moyes' first home game as Manchester United manager. The Blues will finish their campaign away to Cardiff City. During his first spell in charge at Chelsea, Mourinho was unbeaten in 60 league home games.

On 21 June, the club announced a contract extension with Adidas that will see them supply the club kits until 2023. This deal means that Chelsea, along with Arsenal, hold the record for the biggest shirt deal in the history of the Barclays Premier League, valued at £300 million.

Chelsea completed the signing of André Schürrle for a fee of around £18.75 million. Schürrle became Mourinho's first signing since returning to the club, signing a five-year deal. He is the first player to wear the number 14 shirt since Claudio Pizarro in 2007–08.

Marko Marin left Chelsea to go on loan at Sevilla for the duration of the season while Todd Kane and George Saville also went on season long and half-season loans to Blackburn Rovers and Brentford, respectively. Meanwhile, goalkeeper Thibaut Courtois will remain on loan at Atlético Madrid for at least another season.

A number of players were released by the club; Yossi Benayoun, Florent Malouda; who joined Trabzonspor in Turkey; Ross Turnbull, who signed for Doncaster Rovers; and several youth prospects that failed to live up to expectation. Paulo Ferreira retired from football after several years at the club and Jeffrey Bruma was sold to PSV for £2.5 million.

July
Chelsea signed midfielder Marco van Ginkel from Dutch club Vitesse for an undisclosed fee, but a reported £8 million deal. The 20-year-old signed on a five-year deal and was Chelsea's second signing of the summer. Van Ginkel won the 2012 Dutch Football Talent of the Year.

Chelsea also announced the signing of former Fulham goalkeeper Mark Schwarzer, on a free transfer. After having two bids rejected for Norwich City goalkeeper John Ruddy, Mourinho decided to sign Mark Schwarzer as back up for Petr Čech. Oriol Romeu left Chelsea to go on loan at Valencia for the entirety of the season, while West Bromwich Albion youngster Isaiah Brown was signed for around £250,000. Mourinho won his first game back as Chelsea boss after overseeing a 1–0 friendly victory over the Singha All-Stars on 17 July in Chelsea's first leg of their Asian tour in Bangkok. A few days later, on 21 July, Chelsea won the second leg of their Asian tour with a 4–1 victory over a Malaysian XI in Shah Alam. On 23 July, Chelsea announced the signing of Cristián Cuevas from Chilean club O'Higgins.

Chelsea rounded off their Asian tour with an 8–1 demolition of the BNI Indonesia All-Stars in Jakarta on 25 July.

A number of young players were sent on loan to gain first-team experience; Patrick van Aanholt and Gaël Kakuta were both sent on loan to Vitesse for another season, Matej Delač was sent on a season-long loan to Vojvodina in Serbia, whilst Sam Walker and Daniel Pappoe were both loaned to Colchester United for the first half of the season. Additionally, Patrick Bamford, Billy Clifford and Milan Lalkovič were sent on half-season loans to Milton Keynes Dons, Yeovil and Walsall respectively, whilst Eden Hazard's younger brother Thorgan also saw his loan with Zulte-Waregem in Belgium renewed for the season.

August
On 1 August, Chelsea announced that senior reserve goalkeeper Henrique Hilário had signed a new one-year deal after his contract had expired in June. Another youngster was signed, teenage Croatian striker Stipe Perica. Eighteen-year-old defender Nathan Aké signed a new five-year contract with Chelsea, he made six appearances for the Blues last season.

Chelsea recorded a comfortable 2–0 victory over Inter Milan in Round 1 of prestige exhibition tournament the International Champions Cup on 1 August in Indianapolis. Chelsea registered another win in their Round 2 fixture three days later on 4 August, once again a comfortable 2–0 victory, this time over Internazionale's cross-town rivals Milan in New York City. On 7 August, Chelsea lost their perfect pre-season record after they were defeated in the International Champions Cup final by Real Madrid in Miami, losing 3–1. Chelsea won their final game of pre-season in a 2–1 victory over Roma in Washington, D.C., on 10 August. This marked the end of a largely successful pre-season for Chelsea, registering wins over Italian top flight opposition in Inter, Milan and Roma, while comfortably defeating three Asian sides.

Yet again, more youngsters were sent on loan and in keeping with Chelsea's special relationship with Vitesse, newly signed Chilean youngster Cristián Cuevas and Lucas Piazon were sent on loan to the Dutch side while Jhon Pírez will spend another season out on loan at third division Spanish outfit Leganés. Promising young full-back Wallace was sent on loan to Inter Milan and newly signed striker Stipe Perica joined NAC Breda.

On 18 August, Mourinho won his "second" first competitive game in charge of Chelsea with a 2–0 victory over Hull City. Despite Frank Lampard's early penalty miss, Oscar gave Chelsea the lead, poking the ball under the onrushing Allan McGregor after a sumptuous passing move. A superb 35-yard free kick from Lampard sealed the win before the half-hour. The victory meant that Mourinho's Chelsea were unbeaten at Stamford Bridge in 61 league games. Chelsea continued their strong home form under Mourinho with a narrow 2–1 win over Aston Villa on 21 August. An own goal by Antonio Luna opened the scoring after Brad Guzan's save from an Eden Hazard shot rebounded off of him and into the net. Villa later equalised through a quickfire shot from Christian Benteke inside Petr Čech's near post, but after 73 minutes, Branislav Ivanović connected with Lampard's free kick to head home the winner. On 28 August, it was confirmed that Chelsea had signed Willian for £30 million from Anzhi Makhachkala. It was reported that Roman Abramovich used his Russian connections and called the Anzhi owner to convince him to join, even though he had already completed a medical for Tottenham Hotspur.

In their final game before their UEFA Super Cup clash with Bayern Munich, Chelsea were held by Manchester United to a dour 0–0 draw at Old Trafford on 26 August. Just before Chelsea were drawn in the 2013–14 UEFA Champions League group stage, they announced the signing of Samuel Eto'o from Anzhi in a deal believed to be around £2 million. Chelsea were drawn in Group E alongside Schalke 04, Basel and Steaua București. Last season, Chelsea defeated Steaua and Basel on their way to the 2012–13 UEFA Europa League title.

On 30 August, Chelsea were beaten in the UEFA Super Cup by Bayern Munich on penalties at the Eden Arena in Prague. The match was a tense encounter largely dominated by Bayern, but Chelsea were dangerous on the break, opening the scoring through a fantastic strike from Fernando Torres, who was set up by André Schürrle, who had received the ball from Eden Hazard following a mazy run. Bayern equalised through a sweetly struck shot by Franck Ribéry inside Petr Čech's near post. With five minutes left, Ramires was sent off for a second bookable offence leaving Chelsea to face extra-time with ten men. Early in the first half of extra-time, Hazard put Chelsea ahead after beating two Bayern defenders and wrong-footing Manuel Neuer. Chelsea managed to hold on until the final five seconds after spending much of extra-time camped in their own 18-yard box, but Javi Martínez broke their hearts putting the ball past Čech after a deflection carried it into his path. During the penalty shoot-out, all the players on both sides scored their penalties up until Chelsea's final penalty taker, Romelu Lukaku, hit a tame penalty that was saved by Neuer, thus sealing the win for Bayern.

September
Chelsea announced the signing of Porto winger Christian Atsu for a reported £3.5 million. The 21-year-old was sent to Chelsea's partner club Vitesse, who have been sent many young Chelsea players for development in recent years, on a season-long loan. On the final day of the transfer window, Victor Moses and Romelu Lukaku joined Merseyside clubs Liverpool and Everton, respectively, on season-long loans whilst Ulises Dávila was sent to Córdoba in Spain. Later in the month, young English players Nathaniel Chalobah and Josh McEachran were sent on loan to Nottingham Forest and Watford, respectively, until the turn of the year.

On 14 September, Mourinho suffered the first defeat of his "second coming" as Chelsea were defeated 1–0 by Everton through a Steven Naismith header in first-half stoppage time after an impressive defensive display by the Merseyside club at Goodison Park. Four days later, Chelsea suffered a shock defeat by Basel in their opening group game in the Champions League at Stamford Bridge. Chelsea opened the scoring just before the interval through a tidy finish by Oscar from eight yards out, though two quickfire goals for Basel in the last 15 minutes from Mohamed Salah and Marco Streller condemned Chelsea to their first-ever loss in an opening group game of the Champions League.

Chelsea won their following fixture in the Premier League on 21 September after a four-game winless streak and two game losing streak in all competitions against Fulham. The 2–0 victory was secured by two close-range finishes by Oscar and John Obi Mikel respectively, the latter being a staggering surprise, as Mikel had not scored for Chelsea since 2007 and became the source of many jokes between Chelsea fans.

After two well-worked goals from Fernando Torres and Ramires, Chelsea comfortably defeated Swindon Town in their League Cup third round tie on 24 September to set up a trip to the Emirates to face local rivals Arsenal. Four days later, Chelsea faced another local rival in Tottenham. The game ended all square with Tottenham going in front through a Gylfi Sigurðsson goal in the 19th minute, and the Chelsea equaliser coming from a Juan Mata set piece which that headed in by Chelsea captain John Terry in the 65th minute. A controversial moment in this game involving Jan Vertonghen and Fernando Torres resulted in the latter being sent off for a second bookable offence for a perceived elbow into Vertonghen's face, replays suggest there was little, if any contact.

October
On 1 October, Chelsea convincingly defeated Steaua București in Romania 0–4 in their second Champions League group game. The rout was started with a tap-in from Ramires, followed by a saved Samuel Eto'o shot rebounding off a defender's shin for a second. In the second half, Ramires completed a brace with a strong shot into the near post after impressive wing-play by André Schürrle and Frank Lampard finished Steaua off with a trade-mark goal, a low shot from 18 yards skimming in off the base of the far post. Chelsea won their third game in a row by defeating Norwich 1–3 at Carrow Road on 6 October. Chelsea went ahead in the fourth minute through an 18-yard strike from Oscar, though they were pulled back in the 68th minute by an Anthony Pilkington header before Eden Hazard scored the winner from a quick counter-attack, the win was sealed with a spectacular finish from Willian, scoring his first for Chelsea.

Chelsea continued their fine form, beating Cardiff City 4–1 on 19 October, their third consecutive win in all competitions. Cardiff opened the scoring through Jordon Mutch, capitalising on a David Luiz mistake, however Chelsea dominated the game from there on in, with two goals from Eden Hazard and high quality finishes from Samuel Eto'o and Oscar completing the rout. This victory preserved Chelsea's perfect home league record. Three days later, Chelsea earned three valuable points after defeating Schalke 04 3–0 in their third Champions League group game, with Fernando Torres scoring a brace and Eden Hazard scoring late on through an impressive solo effort.

On 27 October, Chelsea faced Manchester City, an important game for both sides looking to continue strong league forms. The match was a tense encounter in which Fernando Torres played superbly, netting a late winner following a defensive mix-up after setting up André Schürrle for Chelsea's first. Manchester City equalised through Sergio Agüero early in the second half, however they could not hold on for a point.

A Chelsea containing ten changes defeated Arsenal in the Fourth Round of the League Cup, with a goal in each half from Spaniards César Azpilicueta and Juan Mata. The following day, the Blues were drawn to face either Southampton or Sunderland away in the next round.

Chelsea completed the signing of promising 18-year-old midfielder Bertrand Traoré on a four-and-a-half-year contract. He had previously played for the Blues on the pre-season tour of Asia and scored against the Malaysia XI and the Indonesia All Stars.

November
An underwhelming Chelsea display ended in defeat by Newcastle United on 2 November, with goals from Yoan Gouffran and Loïc Rémy. In a post-match interview, Mourinho expressed his bewilderment at the result: "I am angry, because I don't understand why after a fantastic run of matches, we lose this game"(BBC MOTD). Chelsea continued their strong Champions League form by defeating Schalke 04 3–0 at Stamford Bridge on 6 November in their fourth group game with a brace from Samuel Eto'o and an acrobatic volley from Demba Ba, thus making it three consecutive wins without conceding a goal.

Three days later, Chelsea drew 2–2 with West Brom at home, a last minute Eden Hazard penalty saving the point. On 23 November, Chelsea returned to winning ways following the international break with a 0–3 win against West Ham United at Upton Park. A brace from Frank Lampard either side of a fine finish from Oscar sealed the win for the Blues and moved them up above Southampton to third. Chelsea again displayed inconsistent form, however, later losing 1–0 to Basel on 26 November without registering a shot on target.

December
Chelsea started December with a home win against Southampton, continuing their strong home form in the league. The Saints took a shock early lead, Jay Rodriguez finding the back of the net with only 13 seconds on the clock. The Blues came back to win through second half goals from John Terry, Gary Cahill and a late goal from substitute Demba Ba. Chelsea's next match saw them defeat a spirited Sunderland side 3–4 in a thrilling, topsy-turvy encounter at the Stadium of Light; yet again the Blues went behind but were able to fight back to get the win following a mercurial display by Eden Hazard, who scored a brace. After three wins on the trot, Chelsea went to the Britannia Stadium looking to close the gap on leaders Arsenal to one point. Having gone 0–1 up through a solo effort from André Schürrle, things seemed to be going well, but Stoke capitalised on a defensive error to go into the break tied at 1–1. A Stephen Ireland goal put the hosts ahead, but not for long as Schürrle scored his third of the season and second of the match, again from outside the area. A draw was looking likely until Oussama Assaidi gave Stoke the full three points with a curling strike from 20 yards out to send Mourinho's men away empty-handed.

Chelsea finished in first place in their Champions League group after beating Steaua București at Stamford Bridge through a solitary Demba Ba goal. They were then subsequently drawn to play Galatasaray in the first knockout round, meaning former legendary forward Didier Drogba will play Chelsea for the first time since leaving the club after the 2012 Champions League Final. Chelsea edged passed Crystal Palace 2–1 following a sublime Ramires strike, to move two points behind Arsenal after they lost 6–3 to Manchester City.

Chelsea travelled to the Stadium of Light for the second time in a month to face Sunderland in the quarter-final of the League Cup. Despite leading for most of the second half through a scrambled Frank Lampard finish (this goal was the first incident to require the use of hawk-eye technology in League Cup history) and barely being troubled by their opponents' attack, a late equaliser from former Chelsea man Fabio Borini pushed the game into extra time, where a 118th-minute winner from Ki Sung-yueng saw Chelsea dumped out of the Capital One Cup. On 23 December, Chelsea faced a tough trip to Arsenal yet they came through it unscathed, drawing 0–0, keeping their first clean sheet since the 3–0 victory over West Ham. On Boxing Day, an Eden Hazard goal granted Mourinho's team a 1–0 win over Swansea City. Chelsea's final game of 2013 ended in a superb victory over Liverpool. Despite going behind after three minutes, goals from Eden Hazard and Samuel Eto'o moved the Blues four points ahead of Liverpool and two points behind leaders Arsenal.

January
Chelsea kicked off 2014 with an impressively comfortable 0–3 away victory against this season's surprise package Southampton. Southampton kept Chelsea at bay until midway through the second half, when Mourinho made a double substitution, taking André Schürrle and Juan Mata off for Willian and Oscar, the latter of whose deflected cross was tapped by Fernando Torres in the 60th minute, and later scored himself in the 82nd minute following a good strike by Willian.

Unbeknownst to all, this would be Juan Mata's final Chelsea appearance, reacting angrily to his substitution in the 53rd minute following a mostly poor season, spending most of it on the bench. Over the course of two-and-a-half seasons, Mata made 135 appearances for Chelsea, scoring 33 goals and winning both the Champions League and the Europa League alongside the FA Cup following a highly successful spell at the club, winning the Chelsea the Player of the Year award in two consecutive seasons.

Chelsea began their 2014 FA Cup campaign with a comfortable 2–0 win against second-tier side Derby County, managed by former England coach Steve McClaren. Victory came courtesy of a rare John Obi Mikel goal, scoring his second of the season despite not having scored since 2007 before his goal against Fulham in October, followed by an Oscar goal 20 minutes from time that sealed the win. On 11 January, Chelsea won their fourth consecutive league game at the KC Stadium with a 0–2 win over Hull City, with goals from Hazard and Torres.

Chelsea made it five league wins on the trot with an impressive 3–1 home win against Manchester United on 19 January, with a Samuel Eto'o hat-trick making the difference. Chelsea progressed to the Fifth Round of the FA Cup with a 1–0 victory over Stoke City, the winner being a superb Oscar free-kick in the first half. Chelsea, however, failed to complete a perfect January as they drew 0–0 to relegation candidates West Ham. Chelsea had 39 shots throughout the game yet failed to score, the first time since the 2003–04 Premier League season that this has happened.

On the final day of the January Transfer Window, Chelsea signed French youngster Kurt Zouma for a reported £12 million from Saint-Étienne. The defender was imminently loaned back to Saint-Étienne for the remainder of the season.

February
Chelsea became the first premier league team to defeat Manchester City and the first team to stop them scoring at the Etihad Stadium all season as a Branislav Ivanović scored after 32 minutes. City had scored 42 goals in 11 games and had not fail to score at home since Birmingham City held them to a 0–0 draw in November 2010. Etihad Stadium While becoming the first team to do the double over City since Everton in the 2010–11 season. The win moved Chelsea level on points with City, yet behind on goal difference, +41 to Chelsea's +24.

On 8 February, Chelsea defeated Newcastle United at Stamford Bridge, 3–0. Eden Hazard scored his first hat-trick for Chelsea, which also saw them go to the top of the table.
Chelsea's good February form stuttered as they slipped up to a draw away to West Brom and being knocked out of the 2013–14 FA Cup to Manchester City.

Chelsea, however, ended February on a high, as a last minute Frank Lampard free-kick against Everton, 1–0, kept Chelsea top of the table. Additionally, Chelsea finished February in good form as they grabbed a 1–1 draw at 2013 Turkish Champions Galatasaray. Fernando Torres gave Chelsea a vital away goal, before an Aurélien Chedjou goal pulled the Turkish club back into it.

March
Chelsea started March by defeating West London rivals Fulham 1–3 away at Craven Cottage. In the match, André Schürrle grabbed a second-half hat-trick to move Chelsea four points ahead of both second-placed Liverpool and third-placed Arsenal.

One week later, Chelsea again triumphed in a London derby, defeating Tottenham 4–0 home. First, Samuel Eto'o capitalised on a mistake from Jan Vertonghen before Younès Kaboul fouled the Cameroonian and was subsequently sent off, conceding a penalty that Eden Hazard converted. Spurs played the last 30 minutes with ten men, and in the last five minutes, Demba Ba scored twice to triple his goal tally for the season. The win moved Chelsea seven points ahead of second place with the other teams behind having played fewer games.

Chelsea's 14 Premier League unbeaten run came to an end at Aston Villa in controversial fashion. Willian was sent off after two debatable yellow cards, before Fabian Delph scored a superb winner for the Villains. Ramires, however, was sent off for a poor foul on Karim El Ahmadi and Mourinho was subsequently sent to the stands for protesting the red card. Despite the loss, Chelsea still remained four points ahead of nearest rivals Liverpool in the standings.

Three days later, Chelsea became the first English team to progress in the Round of 16 in the Champions League by defeating Galatasaray at Stamford Bridge. An early goal from Samuel Eto'o and a goal two minutes before half time from Gary Cahill sent the Blues to the next round.

Chelsea finished March in disappointment, as they succumbed to defeat at Selhurst Park against Crystal Palace, 1–0. John Terry scored an unfortunate own goal after 52 minutes as Chelsea lost top spot for the first time since the beginning of February.

April
Chelsea began April in poor fashion, as they lost 3–1 to Paris Saint-Germain at the Parc des Princes, leaving their 2013–14 Champions League hopes in the balance. Ezequiel Lavezzi gave PSG the lead after three minutes before Eden Hazard equalised from the penalty spot. An own goal from David Luiz, however, and a last minute goal from Javier Pastore will require of Chelsea to score a minimum of two goals at Stamford Bridge in the home leg.

Chelsea moved back to the top of the table as they defeated Stoke City at Stamford Bridge. Goals from new signing Mohamed Salah, Frank Lampard and Willian gave the Blues all three points. Lampard's goal was his 250th of his career, having scored 210 for Chelsea, 39 for West Ham and one for Swansea.

The second leg of the Champions League quarter-final ended in dramatic fashion, as a last minute goal from Demba Ba sent Chelsea through to the semi-finals at the expense of PSG. Eden Hazard limped off early and was replaced by André Schürrle, who subsequently scored from a long throw-in after 32 minutes before Demba Ba's late goal secured Mourinho's unbeaten record in the Champions League quarter-final stage.

Ba scored his second goal in two games as Chelsea edged past ten-men Swansea 0–1 at the Liberty Stadium.

Mourinho's superb unbeaten home record fell apart on 19 April as Sunderland defeated the Blues 1–2. Despite Samuel Eto'o's early goal, goals from Connor Wickham and a penalty from Fabio Borini left Chelsea five points behind league leaders Liverpool.

Despite a successful 0–0 draw at the Vicente Calderón to Atlético Madrid, major injuries to goalkeeper Petr Čech and captain John Terry meant that Chelsea would finish the season without their captain and second vice-captain.

Ramires was given a four-match suspension for violent conduct during the Sunderland defeat and will subsequently miss the remainder of the season, as well as the first game of the 2014–15 Premier League season.

Chelsea edged closer to Liverpool at the top of the table by defeating them 0–2 at Anfield. Demba Ba capitalised on a Steven Gerrard error to give the Blues the lead in first-half stoppage time before Fernando Torres broke away and set up Willian to send Chelsea two points behind Liverpool.

The Blues crashed out of the Champions League in the second leg of the semi-finals to Atlético, 1–3. Fernando Torres gave Chelsea the lead before goals from Adrián, Diego Costa and Arda Turan gave Mourinho a sixth defeat in eight Champions League semi-final appearances.

May
Chelsea all but lost the 2013–14 Premier League title after drawing 0–0 to Norwich in their penultimate game of the season, and their final league season game at home.

Despite a trophyless season for the first team, the Chelsea Youth team won the 2013–14 FA Youth Cup. A late Dominic Solanke brace helped the young Blues come from 3–2 down to defeat Fulham 7–6 on aggregate and secure their third title in five years.

In the last league season game, Chelsea defeated already relegated Cardiff 1–2 at the Cardiff City Stadium, goals from André Schürrle and Fernando Torres helped the Blues come from behind to secure a third-place league finish.

Captain John Terry signed a new one-year with Chelsea, securing his services until the end of the 2014–15 Premier League season.

World Cup News

Chelsea left back Ashley Cole retired from international football as he was subsequently left out of the England squad for the 2014 World Cup in Brazil. He been capped 107 times for the Three Lions and has represented his nation at three World Cups. Frank Lampard and Gary Cahill, however, were both selected by Roy Hodgson for the England squad.

While Christian Atsu was called up for the 26-man provisional squad for Ghana and Cameroon captain Samuel Eto'o was also called up. Quartet David Luiz, Oscar, Ramires and Willian were selected for the Brazilian final 23 and midfielder André Schürrle was also selected for Germany, which would eventually won the tournament.

Club

Coaching staff
{|class="wikitable"
|-
!Position
!Staff
|-
|Manager|| José Mourinho
|-
|rowspan="4"|Assistant Manager|| Steve Holland
|-
| Silvino Louro
|-
| Rui Faria
|-
| José Morais
|-
|Technical Director|| Michael Emenalo
|-
|Goalkeeper Coach|| Christophe Lollichon
|-
|First Team Fitness Coach|| Chris Jones
|-
|Senior Opposition Scout|| Mick McGiven
|-
|Medical Director|| Paco Biosca
|-
|First Team Doctor|| Eva Carneiro
|-
|Under 21 Team Manager|| Dermot Drummy
|-
|Youth Team Manager|| Adi Viveash
|-
|Academy Manager|| Neil Bath
|-
|Match Analyst|| James Melbourne
|-

Other information

|-
||Chief Executive|| Ron Gourlay
|-
  Eugene Tenenbaum

First team squad
Updated on 23 March 2014.

Source: Chelsea FC website

Premier League squad

 HG1 = Association-trained player
 HG2 = Club-trained player
 U21 = Under 21 Player
Source: 2013–14 Premier League Squad

UEFA Champions League squad

 B = List B Player
 HG1 = Association-trained player
 HG2 = Club-trained player
Source: 2013–14 UEFA Champions League squad

Transfers and loans

In

Summer

Winter

Out

Summer

Winter

Loan out

Summer

Winter

Overall transfer activity

Total Spending
Summer:  £63,900,000

Winter:  £44,500,000

Total:  £108,400,000

Income
Summer:  £2,500,000

Winter:  £53,600,000

Total:  £56,100,000

Expenditure
Summer:  £61,400,000

Winter:  £9,100,000

Total:  £52,300,000

Pre-season

Friendlies

International Champions Cup

Competitions

UEFA Super Cup

Premier League

League table

Results summary

Results by matchday

Matches

FA Cup

League Cup

UEFA Champions League

Group stage

Knockout phase

Round of 16

Quarter-finals

Semi-finals

Statistics

Appearances
Last updated on 11 May. The list is sorted by shirt number when total appearances are equal.

Goalscorers
This includes all competitive matches. The list is sorted by shirt number when total goals are equal.
Last updated on 11 May

Clean sheets
Last updated on 11 May 2013

Summary

Awards

Player

Team
LMA Performance of the Week

References

Chelsea
Chelsea F.C. seasons
Chelsea